The Ilio DiPaolo Memorial Show was an annual professional wrestling event held between 1996 and 1999 as a tribute to wrestler Ilio DiPaolo and featured talent from World Championship Wrestling as well as appearances from older wrestling stars of the "television era". Several of these wrestlers came out of retirement to face their former rivals on the first three shows.

The show was organized by Dennis DiPaolo, along with family and friends of the late Ilio DiPaolo, and the proceeds were generally donated to charitable organizations. The second show, held at the Marine Midland Arena in 1997, was attended by over 16,000 people and raised $70,000 each for the Sick Children's Hospital and the Ilio DiPaulo Scholarship Fund. Jim Kelly, a former quarterback for Buffalo Bills, also received a plaque in recognition for his charity work and was one of several guest celebrities to appear on the show. Although many celebrities were paid for their appearances, wrestlers such as Johnny Barend did not accept payment to perform at the event.

Show results

First Annual Ilio DiPaolo Memorial Show
June 7, 1996 in Buffalo, New York (Buffalo Memorial Auditorium)
Introduction: Johnny Barend, Dominic DeNucci, The Destroyer, Mario Fratterali, Woody Johnson, Gene Kiniski, Reginald Love, Angelo Mosca, Tony Parisi, Angelo Poffo, Johnny Powers, Bruno Sammartino, Waldo Von Erich, and Kurt Von Hess.

Second Annual Ilio DiPaolo Memorial Show
June 6, 1997 in Buffalo, New York (Marine Midland Arena)

Third Annual Ilio DiPaolo Memorial Show
June 11, 1998 in Buffalo, New York (Marine Midland Arena)
Introduction: Dick Beyer, Gino Brito, Willie Farkas, Billy Red Lyons, Tony Marino, George Scott, Lou Thesz, Angelo Poffo, Waldo Von Erich and Kurt Von Hess.

Fourth Annual Ilio DiPaolo Memorial Show
June 11, 1999 in Buffalo, New York (Marine Midland Arena)

References

Further reading
Teal, Scott, ed. "Ilio DiPaolo Memorial Show." Whatever Happened To...? 1.36 (2005).

Professional wrestling memorial shows
1996 in professional wrestling
1997 in professional wrestling
1998 in professional wrestling
1999 in professional wrestling
Professional wrestling in Buffalo, New York